T. A. Razzaq (25 April 1958 – 15 August 2016) was an Indian screenwriter, who worked on Malayalam movies. He was born to T.A.Bappu and Vazhayil Khadeeja. His younger brother, T. A. Shahid, was also a screenwriter who wrote scripts for successful films such as Balettan and Perumazhakkalam. He has received Kerala State Film Award for Best Story in 1996 and 2002 and once for Kerala State Film Award for Best Screenplay in 1996. 

He started his film career earlier as assistant director of A .T. Abu with Dhwani and Lenin Rajendran for Vachanam. Later he turned to pen on advice of actor Thilakan who gave him debut to make screenplay based on Thilakan's own directed drama Fasaq screened as "Ghoshayathra" the same as another movie Vishnulokam in 1991. He worked for around 30 Malayalam movies with the areas of his contribution including script, story, and dialogue. He made films with prominent film directors in Malayalam like Kamal, Sibi Malayil, Jayaraj and V.M. Vinu. In 2014, he debuted in direction through the film 'Moonnam Naal Njayarazhcha, which unfortunately became the only film he directed. His last film as a scriptwriter was 'Sukhamayirikkatte', released in 2016. He died at Amrita Hospital in Kochi on 15 August 2016, aged 58. He was undergoing a long battle with liver cirrhosis. He was buried with full state honors at his hometown Kondotty.

Perumazhakkalam, the film he scripted was screened at 21st IFFK as a homage.
He appeared in Ranjith's directed Malayalam film Paleri Manikyam: Oru Pathirakolapathakathinte Katha.

Awards
 1996 Kerala State Film Award for Best Screenplay for Kaanaakkinaavu
 1996 Kerala State Film Award for Best Story for Kaanaakkinaavu
 2002 Kerala State Film Award for Best Story for Aayirathil Oruvan
 2002 Asianet Film Awards for Best Script Writer for Uthaman
 2004 Kerala State Film Award for Best Story for Perumazhakkalam
 2004 Asianet Film Awards for Best Script Writer for Perumazhakkalam

Filmography

Lyrics

 Maanathu Chandiranundo- Aakasham(2007)

References

External links
 
 T A Razzak at MSI

1958 births
2016 deaths
Malayalam screenwriters
Malayalam-language lyricists
Malayali people
Indian Muslims
Indian male screenwriters
Screenwriters from Kochi
People from Malappuram district
20th-century Indian dramatists and playwrights
21st-century Indian dramatists and playwrights
Malayalam film directors
Film directors from Kochi
21st-century Indian film directors
20th-century Indian male writers
21st-century Indian male writers